Muntazir Baba (1950 – 5 January 2018) was a Pushto-language poet. He died in January 2018 at the age of 68.

References

1950 births
2018 deaths
Pashto-language poets